Helladia adelpha is a species of beetle in the subfamily Lamiinae, found in the Near East and Turkey. It is black coloured with brown legs. Adults are on wing from April to June.

References

Lamiinae
Beetles described in 1884
Beetles of Asia